Jan Potměšil (born 31 March 1966 in Prague, Czechoslovakia) is a Czech actor.

In summer 1989, he finished his lectures at the Theatre Faculty of the Academy of Performing Arts in Prague and joined Divadlo na Vinohradech. Later that year, he hooked up with other students and actors who were going to Ostrava to persuade the miners to support the Velvet Revolution. On the way back, his car crashed on a frozen road. Since then, Potměšil has been 
paralysed from the waist down. He uses a wheelchair.

He is currently a prominent member of the Kašpar theatre company that performs in the Divadlo v Celetné, Prague. He performed major characters in several plays. The most notable ones include Charlie Gordon in Flowers for Algernon (more than ten years on the repertoire), the title role in Richard III (received Alfréd Radok Award for best actor), Jesus in Felix Mitterer's Trouble in the House of God, or Polonius in Hamlet. In Lyra Pragensis, he performed Henri Toulouse-Lautrec in Pavlík's Beauty from Moulin Rouge, Fletcher in a scenic reading of Richard Bach's Jonathan Livingston Seagull, and Dickie in Running from Safety of the same author.

Selected filmography 
 1996 – Code Name: Ruby (Jméno kódu Rubín)
 1994 – V erbu lvice
 1988 – Killing with Kindness (Vlastně se nic nestalo)
 1987 – Bony a klid
 1987 – O princezně Jasněnce a létajícím ševci
 1987 – Why? (Proč?)
 1985 – Třetí patro
 1978 – The Secret of Steel City (Tajemství ocelového města)
 1977 – Žena za pultem

External links
 

1966 births
Living people
Male actors from Prague
Czech male stage actors
Czech male film actors
Czech male television actors
Recipients of the Thalia Award